Sustinente is a comune (municipality) in the Province of Mantua in the Italian region Lombardy, located about  southeast of Milan and about  southeast of Mantua.

Sustinente borders the following municipalities: Bagnolo San Vito, Gazzo Veronese, Quingentole, Quistello, Roncoferraro, San Benedetto Po, Serravalle a Po, Villimpenta.

References

Cities and towns in Lombardy